Katherine Raison (born 2 February 1962) is an Australian actress, best known for her roles on television, predominantly in soap operas,

Career

Raison starred in A Country Practice from 1987 to 1990 as Cathy Hayden,  E Street from 1991 to 1992 as Sheriden Sturgess, and  Pacific Drive from 1995 to 1996 as Georgina Ellis

Raison has also appeared in Home and Away, Farscape and All Saints.

In early 2019, Raison began playing a recurring role in long-running series Neighbours. Her character, Claudia Watkins, the cold, estranged mother of established character Finn Kelly (Rob Mills), initially appeared in 6 episodes. She returned for another guest stint in December 2019 during which she causes problems for Elly Conway (Jodi Anasta), the mother of her baby granddaughter to her other son, the then missing and presumed deceased, Shaun Watkins (Brad Moller). Raison returned for a third stint in Neighbours in April 2020 following the death of Finn Kelly. During this stint, her character, goes for custody of her baby granddaughter, and discovers her youngest son, Shaun, is still alive.

Filmography

FILM

TELEVISION

STAGE/THEATRE
 School For Scandal (1985)
 The Marginal Farm (1986)
 Barefoot In The Park (1986)
 Never In My Lifetime (1988)
 A Night In Julia Creek (1989)
 Road (1989)
 Love Letters (1991)
 A Shayna Maidel (1991)
 The Heidi Chronicles (1992)
 Man Of The Moment (1992)
 The Adman (1993)
 Wrong For Each Other (1997)
 The Vagina Monologues (2002)
 Dark Voyager (2014)
 The Good Doctor (2015)
 After The Ball (2018)

External links
 

1962 births
Living people
Australian soap opera actresses